"We Can" is the twenty-fourth single by American country pop singer LeAnn Rimes, released on October 28, 2003 by Curb Records from the Legally Blonde 2: Red, White & Blonde – Motion Picture Soundtrack and was included on Rimes' Greatest Hits album.

The song charted on only two charts in the US peaking at number seventeen on the Billboard Adult Contemporary Charts and at number nineteen on the Billboard Hot Dance Club Play. Internationally, the song peaked at number twenty-seven in the UK, forty in New Zealand, ninety-four in the Netherlands and thirty-seven in Ireland.

Two music videos were released for the song. One video features clips taken from the film and is included on the DVD of the film, while the other features actors and was included on the limited edition DVD that original came with Rimes' Greatest Hits album.

Background
"We Can" and a remix of the song was first released on the Legally Blonde 2: Red, White & Blonde – Motion Picture Soundtrack, on July 1, 2003 by Curb Records. It was released as a single from the soundtrack on October 28, 2003 by Curb Records. The song was later included on Rimes' Greatest Hits album, which was released on November 18, 2003. In 2004, the song was included on The Best of LeAnn Rimes and the Wildlife Radio Edit of the song was released on the remix edition. It is the third time Rimes would work with American songwriter Diane Warren on a soundtrack.

Composition

"We Can" is a pop  song of three minutes and thirty-seven seconds. The song is written by American Grammy Award-winning songwriter, Diane Warren and performed by American country pop singer LeAnn Rimes. The song is written in the key of E major with Rimes' vocals spanning two octaves, from E3 to E5. According to Rimes, the song is about "a testament to the power of working for a common goal."

Promotion
Rimes made several TV appearances to promote the song, including Good Morning America on June 27, 2003, The View on July 2, 2003, "Boston Pops Fireworks Spectacular" on July 4, 2003 and The Tonight Show with Jay Leno on July 14, 2003.

Critical reception
Matt Bjorke of About.com complimented Rimes' for her vocals stating that Rimes is "sounding better than she ever has, and the song fit so well in the movie Legally Blonde 2 that it became the end credits song." Heather Phares of Allmusic called it "pleasant but slightly bland girl-power anthem." Lydia Vanderloo of Barnes & Noble.com praised the song stating it's "an effervescent, chart-worthy tune on which Rimes insists that, against all odds, "We can do the impossible!"" Carla Hay of Billboard.com claimed that "Curb Records is banking on LeAnn Rimes to be a triple-crown soundtracks winner."

Chart performance
In the US the song peaked at number sixteen on the Billboard Adult Contemporary Charts. The song also peaked at number nineteen on the Billboard Hot Dance Club Play.

Internationally the song charted at number thirty-seven on the IRMA. It also charted at number ninety-four on the Netherlands' Mega Single Top 100 chart, number forty on the RIANZ and twenty-seven on the UK's Official Chart Company.

Music video
Two music videos were released for the song. Both videos contains clips of Rimes singing on the hood of a bright-pink car, in front of a pink star design, wearing a blue tanktop and striped skirt, and in front of a pink open-book design lit up like a heart, wearing a pink tanktop and a fluffy yellow skirt. One version of the video contains scenes taken from the film. The second version of the video portrays actors, one in an office, another in a truck, one as a waitress, a cheerleader and a business man. The actress in the office is being yelled at by her boss over her copies being on pink printer paper, the guy in the vintage truck is a farm-boy stuck in a corporate traffic jam, the waitress has a secret crush on the cook, the cheerleader wants to play football and the business man is getting a haircut. At the end of the video, the actress in the office walks away from her boss and throws the copies into the air, the young farmer in the truck starts walking instead of waiting for the traffic jam to move, the waitress kisses the cook, the cheerleader runs out and tackles the quarterback and scores a touchdown, and the business man ends up with a blue Mohawk. The version featuring clips taken from the film was included as a bonus feature on the DVD for the film. The one featuring the clips with the actors was included on the limited edition bonus DVD that came with the original release of Rimes' Greatest Hits album. The music video was shot in Los Angeles and directed by Liz Friedlander.

Track listing

US/UK Remix digital download
 "We Can" (Widelife Radio Edit) – 3:49
 "We Can" (Widelife Mixshow Edit) – 6:56
 "We Can" (Widelife Extended Club) – 10:08
 "We Can" (Brownleewe & Bose Radio Edit) – 4:08
 "We Can" (Brownleewe & Bose Extended Mix) – 5:37
 "We Can" (Tee's Freeze Radio Edit) – 3:37
 "We Can" (Tee's Freeze Extended Mix) – 8:05
 "We Can" (Tee's Freeze Dub) – 6:35
 "We Can" (Piper Extended Club Mix) – 9:05

US 12" vinyl
A "We Can" (Widelife Extended Club) – 10:08
B1 "We Can" (Tee's Freeze Dub) – 6:35
B2 "We Can" (Wildlife Mixshow Edit) – 6:56
C "We Can" (Tee's Freeze Extended Mix) – 8:05
D1 "We Can" (Widelife Dub) – 7:38
D2 "We Can" (Brownleewe & Bose Extended Mix) – 5:37

UK CD single
 "We Can" (Album Version) – 3:37
 "We Can" (Widelife Radio Edit) – 3:49
 "We Can" (Tee's Freeze Radio Edit) – 3:37
 "We Can" (Brownleewe & Bose Radio Edit) – 4:08
"We Can" Music Video

UK Promotional CD single
 "We Can" – 3:37

European CD single
 "We Can" (Album Version) – 3:37
 "We Can" (Widelife Radio Edit) – 3:49
 "We Can" (Tee's Freeze Radio Edit) – 3:37
 "We Can" (Brownleewe & Bose Radio Edit) – 4:08
 "We Can" (American Mix) – 3:36

German CD single
 "We Can" (Album Version) – 3:37
 "We Can" (Brownleewe & Bose Radio Edit) – 4:08

Australian Maxi Single
 "We Can" (Album Version) – 3:37
 "We Can" (Tee's Freeze Radio Edit) – 3:37
 "We Can" (Widelife Radio Edit) – 3:49
 "We Can" (American Mix) – 3:36

Charts

References

External links
We Can official music video at Yahoo.com
We Can official music video at Official site

2003 songs
LeAnn Rimes songs
Music videos directed by Liz Friedlander
Songs written by Diane Warren
Song recordings produced by Dann Huff
Songs written for films